Jindra Dolanský (born December 14, 1964) is a Czech musician.  He was the saxophone player, backup vocalist and co-composer for the Czech avant garde punk rock group Už Jsme Doma from 1985–2001.

In the early '80s, Dolanský became a fixture in the music scene in Teplice, Czech Republic, a town bordering Germany.  He was trained on the clarinet in his youth, making him the only trained member of the original Už Jsme Doma lineup, which he formed with six friends in 1985.  By the end of 1988, he was the only original member remaining.  From 1985-2001, he played in the band led by Miroslav Wanek, until he decided to leave the exhausting lifestyle to focus on his family and opening a restaurant in Prague.  He has since performed with the band on special occasions, most notably their 20th anniversary set, which was released as a live CD and DVD, although only one track featuring Dolanský appears on the former.

Dolanský also performs on the album Fancy, by the Oakland, California, avant garde/rock act Idiot Flesh.  He plays saxophone on the religious snack-food commercial spoof track "Cheezus."'

In early 90th he collaborated with the band "Vesele plavkyně z Miami Beach", found by former UJD bassplayer Pavel Keřka and younger Dolanký's brother Ivo Dolanský on guitar (former FPB player).  There are two recordings left, one is the album Roll Over Teplice, where Dolanský (Jindřich) performs on sax in 4 songs, and demo recording of several songs (approx. 12), which was never released.

References

External links
Official Už Jsme Doma page

1964 births
Living people
Czech musicians